Tianjin Tuanbo Football Stadium is a professional football stadium in Tianjin, China.  The stadium holds 22,320 spectators and opened in 2012.

References

Football venues in Tianjin
Sports venues in Tianjin